Liu Ye (born 23 March 1978) is a Chinese actor. He debuted in Postmen in the Mountains and later on won recognition through critically acclaimed films such as Sky Lovers,  which won him the Artistic Contribution Award at the Tokyo International Film Festival, Lan Yu, which earned him the Best Actor award at the Golden Horse Awards, and Purple Butterfly,

He was ranked 78th on Forbes China Celebrity 100 list in 2013, 48th in 2014, and 89th in 2015.

Career
Liu began his acting career as a student majoring in performing arts at the Central Academy of Drama in Beijing. He made his debut in Postmen in the Mountains (1999) by Huo Jianqi, which won the Best Feature Film Award at China's Golden Rooster Awards and earned Liu a nomination for Best Supporting Actor.
Liu then played a young homosexual man in the film Lan Yu (2000) by Stanley Kwan, which earned him the Best Actor award at the Golden Horse Awards. Thereafter, Liu starred in many acclaimed films such as Sky Lovers (2002), which won him the Artistic Contribution Award at the Tokyo International Film Festival; Balzac and the Little Chinese Seamstress (2002), which helped Liu break into Hollywood. as well as the avant-garde drama film Purple Butterfly (2003), which competed in the 2003 Cannes Film Festival.

Liu's first Hollywood film Dark Matter, based on the 1991 University of Iowa shooting, was filmed in 2006. Starring opposite Meryl Streep, Liu played the role of a Chinese physics postgraduate named Liu Xing. Dark Matter won the Alfred P. Sloan Prize at the 2007 Sundance Film Festival and was released in the United States in April 2008.

Regarded by many as one of mainland's top actors, Liu has appeared on screen in versatile roles, such as a cocky young man in Stanley Kwan's The Foliage (2003), which won him the Best Actor award at the Golden Rooster Awards; a menacing snow wolf in Chen Kaige's The Promise (2005) and a scheming prince in Zhang Yimou's Curse of the Golden Flower (2006); his performance nabbed him a nomination for Best Supporting Actor at the Hong Kong Film Awards. He shed off his melancholic and weak on-screen image to play tougher and more complex roles such as a gangster in John Woo's Blood Brothers (2007) and Ding Sheng's Underdog Knight (2008), where he played a retired and mentally ill soldier. Liu also took on his first villainous role in Connected (2008), a remake of the American film Cellular.

But Liu’s brooding onscreen presence truly came into full view with the nearly simultaneous release of Lu Chuan’s tribute to the Nanjing massacre, City of Life and Death, and Yin Li’s Iron Man (both in 2009). The leading man in both films, Liu plays a brave soldier in Lu’s war epic and a bronzed oil worker in Yin’s film about those who struggled to develop China’s oil industry in the Taklamakan desert in West China; successfully shedding off his previous screen image.

In the 2011 patriotic tribute, The Founding of a Party, it was reported that Liu was required to gain 10 kg in order to play a 30-year-old Mao Zedong, a feat he achieved by eating 20 eggs a day. After filming Andrew Lau's romantic film A Beautiful Life the same year, Liu reunited with Lu Chuan in The Last Supper (2012), a US$15-million historical epic where he plays Liu Bang.

Liu received the Order of Arts and Letters by the French government in 2013.

In 2014, Liu starred in war drama All Quiet in Peking by novelist Liu Heping. The series, based on the events of the War for Liberation in the late 1940s, earned widespread acclaim for its interesting story and historical accuracy; and was a massive success in China.

Liu won the Golden Goblet Award for Best Actor for his performance as a car mechanic who is unexpectedly involved in a murder case in the film Cock and Bull (2016), his first award in ten years.

Other activities
Liu was named ambassador of the French Riviera in 2016. He has been previously appointed tourism ambassador for Israel in 2014. On April 6, 2018, Liu become an honorary citizen of Nice.

Personal life
Liu married French (of Jewish descent) photographer Anais Martane in Beijing on July 5, 2009. Their first child, a son named Noé (Nuoyi in Chinese), was born on October 10, 2010, in France. Two years later, their daughter named Nina was born on January 22, 2012, in Beijing.

Filmography

Film

Television series

Variety show

Awards and nominations

References

External links

 Liu Ye at hkmdb.com
 Liu Ye at chinesemov.com
 

Male actors from Changchun
1978 births
Living people
Central Academy of Drama alumni
20th-century Chinese male actors
21st-century Chinese male actors
Chinese male stage actors
Chinese male film actors
Chinese male television actors